Lampak I is a mountain of the Garhwal Himalaya in Uttarakhand, India.The elevation of Lampak I is  and its prominence is . It is 114th highest located entirely within the Uttrakhand. Nanda Devi, is the highest mountain in this category. It lies 2.3 km SE of Lampak II . Its nearest higher neighbor Gorur Parbat  lies 3.1 km SSE. Uja Tirche  lies 6.4 km NE. It lies 7.7 km west of Shambhu ka Qila .

Climbing history

A 10-member Punjab Police team led by PM Das climbed both Lampak I and Lampak II peaks in the Eastern Garhwal. They expedition established their base camp at 4,700m in the Kala Kharak to the west of the mountains, and then a higher camp I at 5,127m, from which both peaks could be attempted. After the initial success at Lampak II on 7 June they decided for a smaller and experienced climbers for Lampak I. On 9 June, Nari, Inder Kumar, HAP Sangram moved to Camp 1 for route-opening for Camp 2 the next day they found a site for Camp 2 at a height of 5617 m. There was space only for two small tents on the saddle.
On 10 June, team leader PM Das along with Mohan Lal, Anand Singh, HAP Nand Singh occupied Camp 1. On 11 and 12 June Nari, assisted by Inder and HAP Nandan spent time opening the route for Camp 2. They fixed a nylon line of 555 m on the rock and 380 m of their climbing ropes on the ice and snow, anchoring it with snow-stakes and ice pitons. On 13 June Nari, Inder Kumar, HAP Sangram Singh, Mohan Lal and PM Das started early and all five of them were on the summit by 4.30 p.m. This was the first ascent of Lampak I.

Neighboring and subsidiary peaks
Neighboring or subsidiary peaks of Lampak I:
 Lampak II 
 Gorur Parbat 
 Uja Tirche 
 Chalab 
 Hardeol:

Glaciers and rivers
On the west side lies  Kalla Bank Glacier which drains down to Dhauli Ganga near Jumma which later joins Alaknanda River at Vishnu Prayag an 82 km journey from its mouth. Alaknanda river is one of the main tributaries of river Ganga which later joins the other tributaries Bhagirathi river at Dev Prayag and called Ganga there after.

See also

 List of Himalayan peaks of Uttarakhand

References

Mountains of Uttarakhand
Six-thousanders of the Himalayas
Geography of Chamoli district